The Waa-Mu Show (pronounced ) is a non-profit 501(c)(3) organization within Northwestern University in Evanston, Illinois, that produces student written, orchestrated, produced, and performed original musical theatre work every year. The song lyrics, script, and music are developed in a series of classes. It is the institution's longest standing theatrical tradition and is held in Cahn Auditorium on Northwestern's campus. This tradition began as a musical revue, showcasing several different student-written Northwestern-inspired vignettes connected by one single theme. By 2013, the Waa-Mu show evolved into an original full-length musical.

History 
The first Waa-Mu show took place in 1929. A senior Northwestern student Joseph W. Miller and his classmate Darrell Ware wrote the script for and staged the college musical comedy that became "The Waa-Mu Show," the first co-educational college musical show. The Women's Athletic Association (WAA) and the Men's Union (MU) collaborated to put on the first show. The name "Waa-Mu" is derived from the synthesis of the two groups' acronyms.

The WAA had been staging popular all-female musical comedies since 1912; the MU had presented less successful all-male comic operas for a number of years prior to 1929. Both men's and women's shows had been losing money and Miller and Ware raised $1,200 by borrowing $5 a piece from interested students to finance the first show. It also was Miller's and Ware's idea to feature both male and female students in their premiere production. At first, the female WAA committee was reluctant about sharing the stage with the male Mu members, but they eventually agreed to combine talents. The premiere show that Miller and Ware collaborated on was Good Morning Glory.  The Daily Northwestern wrote, "Campus interest is the highest yet for any single dramatic activity in University history." This review prompted the producers to begin formulating and writing the following year's show. Walter Kerr was the principal writer for the 1936 musical revue entitled It Goes to Show. Kerr graduated the following year and eventually become a famous theatre critic for the New York Times. After graduating in 1929, Joe Miller stayed at Northwestern to do graduate work in personnel administration, and Darrell Ware went to Hollywood to write screenplays. In 1931 Northwestern president Walter Dill Scott offered Miller a position on the university's staff as Freshman Advisor and Waa-Mu Director.

In 1938, Waa-Mu board members were not pleased with that year's student-written script. Instead, they staged George Gershwin's musical Of Thee I Sing, about a presidential candidate who promises to bring more love to the White House. Actor Tony Randall (who was then known as Leonard Rosenberg), portrayed a boisterous Texas congressman in the production. Only three times in Waa-Mu's history has non-original material been presented; in 1935 with Ray Henderson's musical Good News, in 1938, with George Gershwin's musical Of Thee I Sing, and in 1993 with Leonard Bernstein's musical On the Town.

Waa-Mu went on hiatus during the World War II years, but was re-launched in 1946. During the three-year break, profits from previous Waa-Mu productions were invested in war bonds. Miller directed the Waa-Mu Show until 1975; his last show was Quick Change. He retired on August 31, 1975 and died in 1979. Tom Roland succeeded Miller as the second director of the Waa-Mu productions in 1976. Occasionally, Waa-Mu has been performed off-campus. The show traveled to Chicago several times after its Evanston run, most notably in 1931 (at the Civic Theatre in Chicago) and 1933. And renowned orchestra leader Fred Waring played original Waa-Mu songs on the radio in 1951.

Waa-Mu performances have been presented at Cahn Auditorium since its 1941 production, Wait A Minute, premiering on the new stage the same year that Scott Hall was completed. Before performances began in Cahn Auditorium, Waa-Mu productions were held at and around the Evanston area, at the New Evanston Theatre and the National College of Education.

People

The 92nd Annual Waa-Mu Show 

Director: Johanna McKenzie Miller

Co-Chairs: Daniel Maton, Madeline Oberle, Mitchell Huntley, Francis Brenner

Writing Coordinators: Lena Moore, Kailey Morand, Reva Sangal

Music Directors: Wes D’Alelio, Oliver Paddock

Choreographer: Ashley Valent

The 91st Annual Waa-Mu Show 

Director: Johanna McKenzie Miller
 Music Supervisor: Ryan T. Nelson
 Co-Chairs: Daniel Maton, Madeline Oberle
 Writing Coordinators: Trevor K. Band, Mitchell Huntley, Jared Son, Francesca Wimer
 Music Directors: Cameron Miya, Samuel Perlman
 Choreographers: Emily Brooks, Alex Angrist, Amanda de la Fuente

The 90th Annual Waa-Mu Show 
 Director: Amanda Tanguay
 Music Supervisor: Ryan T. Nelson
 Co-Chairs: Jessica Nekritz, Annie Beaubien, Pallas Guttierez
 Writing Coordinators: Brandon Acosta, Sarah Geltz, Alex Manna, Bennett Peterson
 Music Directors: Ezri Killeen, Ben Roberts

The 89th Annual Waa-Mu Show 

 Director: Amanda Tanguay
 Music Supervisor: Ryan T. Nelson
 Co-Chairs: Leo Jared Scheck, Emma Griffone, Olivia Worley, Jonathan Toussaint
 Writing Coordinators: Ruchir Khazanchi, Emmet Smith, Matthew Threadgill, Mikey Walden
 Music Directors: Mason Frasher, Saoirse Lee

The 88th Annual Waa-Mu Show 

 Director: Stephen Shellhardt
 Music Supervisor: Ryan T. Nelson
 Co-Chairs: Kaja Burke Williams, Maxwell Beer, Sarah Ohlson, and Andrew Restieri
 Head Writers: Alex Rothfield, Jordan Knitzer, and Alec Steinhorn

The 87th Annual Waa-Mu Show 

 Director: David H. Bell
 Music Supervisor: Ryan T. Nelson
 Co-Chairs: Jessie Jennison, Charlotte Morris, Justin Tepper, and Eric Peters
 Head Writers: Maxwell Beer, Carrie Caffrey, and Alexander Rothfield

The 86th Annual Waa-Mu Show 

 Director: David H. Bell
 Music Supervisor: Ryan T. Nelson
 Co-Chairs: Elizabeth Romero, Fergus Inder, Charlie Oh, and Myrna Conn
 Head Writers: Maxwell Beer, Casey Kendall, and Jon Bauerfeld

The 85th Annual Waa-Mu Show 

 Director: David H. Bell
 Music Supervisor: Ryan T. Nelson
 Co-Chairs: Max Rein, Kylie Mullins, and Hannah Dunn
 Head Writers: Jon Bauerfeld, Charlie Oh, and Myrna Conn

Previous Directors 
 1929–1975: Directed by Joe W. Miller
 1976–1990: Directed by Tom Roland
 1991–1993: Co-Directed by Tom Roland and Dominic Missimi
 1994–2010: Directed by Dominic Missimi
 2011–2017: Directed by David H. Bell
 2018–2019: Directed by Stephen Schellhardt
 2020-2021: Directed by Amanda Tanguay

Notable alumni
 Claude Akins
 Warren Beatty
 Karen Black
 Jeff Blumenkrantz
 Zach Braff
 Nancy Dussault
 Gregg Edelman
 Penny Fuller
 George Furth
 Frank Galati
 Ana Gasteyer
 Larry Grossman
 Charlton Heston
 Laura Innes
 Brian d'Arcy James
 Cloris Leachman
 Shelley Long
 Paul Lynde
 Garry Marshall
 Jenny Powers
 Tony Randall
 Charlotte Rae
 Ann-Margret
 Tony Roberts
 Kate Shindle
 Sheldon Harnick
 Billy Eichner
 Dr. Cody Sweet
 Alan Schmuckler
 Michael Mahler
 Ian Weinberger

Organization 
Several different positions and sub-groups with distinct responsibilities exist within the institution to ease the process of creating an original musical each year. They include:

Program Head: A staff member of the Theatre & Interpretation Center who leads the creation process and makes all final decisions. The Program Head is typically the director of the production as well.

Co-Chairs: The student leaders of the organization who work alongside the Program Head to make decisions about creative and administrative matters.

Writing Coordinators: The student leaders who are in charge of generating and combining material to form a cohesive script for the show.

Executive Board: A group of students who work under the Co-Chairs to handle all administrative, financial and organizational needs.

Creating the Musical Class: A large group of students enrolled in a winter class who generate material for the show including: the script, songs, and lyrics.

Orchestrating the Musical Class: A group of students enrolled in a winter class who generate orchestrations for the show; many of whom go on to join Team Music.

Team Music: A group of students led by the Music Director that creates all of the orchestrations for the songs generated in the Creating the Musical class as well as the incidental music and overture.

The Secret of Camp Elliott 
The Secret Of Camp Elliott premiered digitally in June 2021.

State of the Art 
State of the Art was originally set to open on May 1, 2020. On March 13, 2020, the co-chairs decided to cancel the final reading of the show before it was set to go into rehearsal later that month due to concerns over the COVID-19 pandemic. In-person classes were suspended by the university, and it became clear that a performance as usual in Cahn Auditorium would not be possible. The team quickly pivoted to online rehearsals and soon decided to have an online presentation. State of the Art thus became the first-ever new musical to be presented live over Zoom to an international audience. Tony Award-winning Broadway producer Ken Davenport featured an article by the co-chairs on his blog, and Larson Award winner Ryan Cunningham also wrote an article about the process.

For the Record 
The 2019 production followed a female Chicago journalist embarking on a project to create obituaries for history’s most incredible women, including mathematician and cryptanalyst Gene Grabeel, French swordswoman and opera singer Julie d’Aubigny, and early civil rights leader Ida B. Wells. Inspired by the real life Overlooked (obituary feature), initiated by Amy Padnani at the New York Times.

Another Way West 
The 2016 performance was titled Another Way West. The story follows a female researcher, accompanied by her nieces and nephews, on the Oregon Trail searching for her late ancestor. This show merges the journeys of both the researcher and her ancestor on the Oregon Trail.

Gold 
In 2015, the students put on Gold, based on the 1936 Olympics. The plot centered around journalists sent to report about the Olympics, specifically focusing on the US Basketball Team, the US Swim Team, and the US Track and Field Team. Opening night for the show was May 1, 2015.

Double Feature at Hollywood and Vine, an adaptation of Twelfth Night 
Inspired by the Shakespeare play, Twelfth Night, the 2014 Waa-Mu Show was Double Feature at Hollywood and Vine. The protagonist, Viola, disguises herself as a man in order to find fame as an actor in the 1930s. Opening night for the show was May 2, 2014.

Flying Home 
The performance in 2013 entitled, Flying Home, combined the ideas of three very well known productions, Peter Pan, Alice in Wonderland, and The Wizard of Oz. The main theme of this production is about adolescents leaving home and developing throughout college. Opening night for this performance was May 3, 2013.

List of Shows 

Shows with (*) denote previously produced and non-student written material.

References

External links
Official Website

Student theatre
Northwestern University
501(c)(3) organizations